Costa Rica is scheduled to compete at the 2023 Pan American Games in Santiago, Chile from October 20 to November 5, 2023. This was Costa Rica's 18th appearance at the Pan American Games, having competed at every Games except 1963.

Competitors
The following is the list of number of competitors (per gender) participating at the games per sport/discipline.

Cycling

BMX
Costa Rica qualified two female cyclists in BMX race through the UCI World Rankings.

Racing

Road
Costa Rica qualified 1 road cyclist after winning the event in the 2021 Junior Pan American Games.
Costa Rica also qualified 1 cyclist at the Central American Championships.

Men

Women

Football

Women's tournament

Costa Rica qualified a women's team of 18 athletes after finishing as the top ranked Central American team at the 2022 CONCACAF W Championship.
Summary

Surfing

Costa Rica qualified one female surfer.

Race

Wrestling

Costa Rica qualified one male wrestler (Freestyle 97 kg) through the 2022 Pan American Wrestling Championships held in Acapulco, Mexico.

Men

See also
Costa Rica at the 2024 Summer Olympics

References

Nations at the 2023 Pan American Games
2023
2023 in Costa Rican sport